The common echymipera (Echymipera kalubu), or common spiny bandicoot, is a bandicoot. It is long-snouted even by bandicoot standards. The upper parts are a coarse reddish-brown, flecked with spiny buff and black hairs. The tail is short and almost hairless.

Names
The name kalubu, from which the scientific name is derived, is from the Ma'ya language of the Raja Ampat Islands.

Distribution
The common echymipera is native to New Guinea. Its presence in the Admiralty Islands is due to human introduction several thousand years ago, but not before 13,000 B.P. However, unlike Phalangeridae species (cuscus), which have historically been widely introduced and distributed by humans, the Peramelidae (bandicoots) have generally not been spread as much via human introductions.

It is hunted for human consumption in New Guinea.<ref>Margaretha Pangau-Adam & Richard Noske & Michael Muehlenberg. Wildmeat or Bushmeat? Subsistence Hunting and Commercial Harvesting in Papua (West New Guinea), Indonesia. Hum Ecol (2012) 40:611–621.</ref> The Common echymipera is a host of the Acanthocephalan intestinal parasite Australiformis semoni''.

References 

Peramelemorphs
Marsupials of New Guinea
Mammals of Papua New Guinea
Mammals of Western New Guinea
Least concern biota of Oceania
Mammals described in 1829
Taxa named by Johann Baptist Fischer